The Coxcomb is the third album by David Grubbs, released in 1999 through Rectangle. It is an adaptation of The Blue Hotel, a short story by Stephen Crane.

Track listing

Personnel 
Musicians
Noël Akchoté – voice on "The Coxcomb"
Sasha Andrès – cello and voice on "The Coxcomb"
David Grubbs – guitar and voice on "The Coxcomb", organ on "Aux Noctambules"
Thierry Madiot – bass trombone on "The Coxcomb"
Didier Petit – cello and voice on "The Coxcomb"
Stephen Prina – voice on "The Coxcomb"
Yves Robert – trombone and voice on "The Coxcomb"
Quentin Rollet – alto saxophone on "The Coxcomb"
Production and additional personnel
David Mascunan – mastering
Albert Oehlen – cover art

References

External links 
 

1999 albums
David Grubbs albums